Joy is a brand of dishwashing liquid detergent owned by JoySuds, LLC. The brand was introduced in the United States in 1949 by Procter & Gamble. In 2019, Procter & Gamble sold the rights to the Joy brand for the Americas to JoySuds, LLC.

The brand was an early and long-term sponsor of several "soap operas", including the long-running pioneering soap Search for Tomorrow. There are  several kinescopes existing of 1950s' soap operas containing these commercials, usually with the famous slogan, "From grease to shine in half the time". Joy was an early example of a product being reformulated to include the fragrance of lemons and helped begin the overall trend toward citrus-scented cleaning products. Joy is designed for use in the hand washing of dishes, not automatic dishwashers, and as such also contains emollients designed to protect the user's hands from drying out. Available in both "ultra" (concentrated) and "non-ultra" (regular) strengths, Joy remains one of the most recognizable dish brands in North America, with a loyal customer following across the US and Latin American retail markets. Although Joy’s stapled lemon fragrance remains its most widely distributed line, Orange Joy has grown in popularity in recent years. The brand also offers a commercial grade detergent formula, Joy Professional, which is commonly used in restaurant, hotel and other commercial settings due to its high concentration of surfactants and cleaning effectiveness.

Joy was introduced in Japan during the 1990s, where it became market leader for a period of time.

See also 
List of cleaning agents

References

External links
Joy official US site

Detergents
Cleaning product brands
Soap brands
Procter & Gamble brands
Products introduced in 1949